The 2021–22 Midland Football League season was the eighth in the history of the Midland Football League, a football competition in England. The Midland League operates two divisions in the English football league system, the Premier Division at Step 5, and Division One at Step 6, and these two divisions are covered by this article.

The allocations for Steps 5 and 6 for this season were announced by The Football Association on 18 May 2021, and were subject to appeal.

After the abandonment of the 2019–20 and 2020–21 seasons due to the COVID-19 pandemic in England, numerous promotions were decided on a points per game basis over the previous two seasons.

Premier Division

The Premier Division featured 11 clubs which competed in the previous season, along with eight new clubs.
 Clubs promoted from Division One:
Lichfield City
Uttoxeter Town
 Clubs promoted from the West Midlands (Regional) League Premier Division:
Bewdley Town
Shifnal Town
Wolverhampton Casuals
 Clubs transferred from the North West Counties League Premier Division:
Hanley Town
Whitchurch Alport
 Plus:
Stone Old Alleynians, promoted from North West Counties League Division One South

Congleton Town's initial transfer to this division from the North West Counties League was reversed on appeal.

League table

Inter-step play-offs

Results table

Stadia and locations

Division One

Division One featured eight clubs which competed in the previous season, along with eleven new clubs, from the West Midlands (Regional) League:
 AFC Bridgnorth
 Bilston Town
 Cradley Town
 Darlaston Town
 Dudley Sports
 Dudley Town
 OJM Black Country Rangers
 Shawbury United
 Smethwick Khalsa Football Federation, formerly Smethwick Rangers
 Wednesfield
 Wolverhampton Sporting Community

League table

Play-offs

Results table

Stadia and locations

Division Two 

Division Two featured 12 clubs which competed in the division last season, along with 3 new clubs:

Cadbury Athletic, voluntary demoted from Division One 
Kenilworth Sporting, promoted from Division Three
Inkberrow, promoted from Division Three

League table

Division Three

Division Three featured 11 clubs which competed in the division last season, along with 5 new club:
AFC Coventry Rangers
AFC Birmingham, transferred from the West Midlands (Regional) League Division Two
Balsall and Berkswell, joined from the Coventry Alliance
DSC United
Bartley Reds

League table

References

External links
 Midland Football League

2021-22
9